William Salter Blackledge (1793March 21, 1857) was a U.S. Congressman from North Carolina between 1821 and 1823.

Born in Pitt County, North Carolina the son of William Blackledge, who would himself become a Congressman from North Carolina, Blackledge moved to Craven County, North Carolina at an early age, eventually settling in New Bern. He attended the University of North Carolina at Chapel Hill, graduating in 1813.

William married Mary Fonvielle Hatch (daughter of Edmund Hatch and Miriam Simmons) on 26 April 1815 and they had two children, Virginia and Richard.

William was a slave owner as was his father.

Blackledge was elected to the North Carolina House of Commons in 1820, and soon afterwards was elected to the United States House of Representatives to fill the vacancy created by the death of Jesse Slocumb and was then elected to the 17th U.S. Congress. Blackledge served in Congress from February 7, 1821 to March 3, 1823.

Blackledge died in 1857 in New Bern, where he is buried.

References

External links

1793 births
1857 deaths
Members of the North Carolina House of Representatives
Politicians from New Bern, North Carolina
Democratic-Republican Party members of the United States House of Representatives from North Carolina
19th-century American politicians